Magueyes Urbano is one of the 31 barrios in the municipality of Ponce, Puerto Rico.  Along with Canas Urbano, Machuelo Abajo, Portugués Urbano, and San Antón, Magueyes Urbano is one of the municipality's five originally rural barrios that are now also part of the urban zone of the city of Ponce. The name of this barrio is of native Indian origin. It was created in 1953.

Location
Magueyes Urbano is an urban barrio located in the southern section of the municipality, within the Ponce city limits, and northwest of the traditional center of the city, Plaza Las Delicias.

Boundaries
It is bounded on the North by J. J. Cartagena Street (Las Delicias community), Ruth Fernandez Boulevard, and Camino de Ponce (Golf Club) Road, on the South by PR-123, Ausencia Street, and La Gloria Street, on the West by the hills west of PR-123, and on the East by Novedades Street, the hills east of Ponce Cement and the future western branch of PR-9.

 
In terms of barrio-to-barrio boundaries, Magueyes Urbano is bounded in the North by Magueyes, in the South by Canas Urbano, in the West by Canas, and in the East by Portugués Urbano.  The community of Las Delicias is found here.

Features and demographics
Magueyes Urbano has  of land area and no water area.  In 2000, the population of Magueyes Urbano was 1,332 persons, and it had a density of 1,070 persons per square mile.

In 2010, the population of Magueyes Urbano was 1,132 persons, and it had a density of 912.9 persons per square mile.

Major roads in Magueyes Urbano are PR-123 and PR-9.

Notable landmarks
Barrio Magueyes Urbano is home to Ponce Cement, Inc. and the NRHP-listed Cementerio Catolico San Vicente de Paul.

See also

 List of communities in Puerto Rico

References

External links

Barrio Magueyes Urbano
1853 establishments in Puerto Rico